Brava Linhas Aéreas Ltda, formerly known as NHT Linhas Aéreas, was a domestic airline based in Porto Alegre, Brazil founded in 2006. The airline has been grounded since late 2013 after the National Civil Aviation Agency of Brazil (ANAC) suspended the company's Transportation Operating Certificate. The airline does not currently operate any flights. Jorge Barouki, president of the company, has stated that Brava requested the suspension since the airline no longer had the capital to pay its employees.

According to the National Civil Aviation Agency of Brazil (ANAC) between January and December 2012 Brava (then still operating as NHT) had 0.02% of the domestic market share in terms of passengers-kilometre flown.

History
Originally named NHT Linhas Aéreas, the airline started operations in August 2006 serving cities in Rio Grande do Sul. After expanding services in the states of Paraná, Rio Grande do Sul, and Santa Catarina, on April 9, 2010 NHT was granted much sought-for slots at São Paulo-Congonhas Airport, enabling the airline to start services to the state of São Paulo.

Previously controlled by JMT Holding, which belongs to the family Teixeira, on May 18, 2012 NHT was sold to Group Acauã, belonging to the entrepreneur Jorge Barouki. Whereas JMT will dedicate itself to road transportation, Acauã plans to increase the fleet and open new routes, particularly in the state of Santa Catarina.

As of March 2013 the airline ceased to use its original name NHT Linhas Aéreas and, as part of rebranding strategy, started to use the new name Brava Linhas Aéreas. Plans exist to start using four Embraer EMB 120 Brasília.

By the end of 2013, the airline had been grounded by the National Civil Aviation Agency of Brazil (ANAC) and ceased all flights.

As of July 2019, the airline was reported as being out of business.

Destinations

As of July 2015, Brava Linhas Aéreas is grounded and no longer has scheduled flights in Brazil.

Fleet
As of February 2014 the fleet of Brava Linhas Aéreas included the following aircraft:

Affinity Program
Brava Linhas Aéreas has no Frequent Flyer Program.

See also
List of defunct airlines of Brazil

References

External links

NHT Linhas Aéreas Photo Archive at airliners.net

Defunct airlines of Brazil
Airlines established in 2006
Airlines disestablished in 2013